Gulmarrad is a locality contiguous to the town of Maclean, New, South, Wales in northern New South Wales Australia. Classed as rural residential, residents enjoy acreage living. Brooms Head Road passes through the middle of the locality. 

It is part of the Clarence Valley local government area.

Gulmarrad has a local church on The Selection (In Causley Farm Estate).

There are no shopping facilities at Gulmarrad with the closest shop, a small general store, bottle shop, service station outlet at Townsend. The local Post Office and full retail facilities are available at nearby Maclean which shares the same 2463 postcode.

Roads 
The main road is Brooms Head Road which goes through each end of the suburb. The main suburban roads are Major Mitchell Dr, Sheehans Ln, Colonial Dr and Rosella Rd.

Schools 
It has a public school Gulmarrad Public School. Established 1891

The main High School in the area is Maclean High School. Maclean High School Busways Bus List.

Housing 
Gulmarrad average land size is one acre starting at $400,000. Gulmarrad has several housing estates such as Stockmans Rest, McIntyre's Ridge, Causley Farm, Whispering Pines, Tanderra Estate and Cameron Hill.

References 

Towns in New South Wales
Clarence Valley Council